Certo certissimo... anzi probabile (Certain, Very Certain, As a Matter of Fact... Probable; English title Diary of a Telephone Operator) is a 1969 Italian film based on the story of the same title by Dacia Maraini. It stars Claudia Cardinale and Catherine Spaak.

Plot
Marta works as a telephone operator for a telephone company. She lives with her friend Nanda in Nanda's flat but Nanda's priority is above anything else to find a husband. When she feels she has found the right man she doesn't want Marta any longer in her flat. But while Nanda's relationship fails, Marta meets and marries a man named Pietro. Only then it turns out her husband has an old friend. The man, a foreigner, moves in with the two of them. Marta tries to pair off the foreigner with her single friend Nanda. Both women think this might work out. But Pietro's friend has bought a boat in order to sail around the world with Pietro and when the friend announces to do this alone, Marta's husband has a breakdown. In the end Pietro abandons Marta, explaining to her that he has no plans for a return from this journey with his friend.

Cast
Claudia Cardinale:	Marta Chiaretti
Catherine Spaak: Nanda
Robert Hoffmann: Stefano
Nino Castelnuovo: Pietro
John Phillip Law: Crispino
 Aldo Giuffrè: the widow
Alberto Lionello: director of a telephone company
Antonio Sabàto: Carmelo
 Dada Gallotti: Marta's boss
 Francesco Mulé: examiner
Lino Banfi: photographer

References

1969 films
Italian comedy films
1960s Italian-language films
Films directed by Marcello Fondato
Films scored by Carlo Rustichelli
Films set in Rome
Films shot in Rome
Films about telephony
1960s Italian films